Zahra Khanom or Taj al-Saltaneh (1884 – 25 January 1936) also known as princess Qajar, was a princess of the Qajar dynasty, known as a feminist, a women's rights activist and a memoirist. She was the daughter of Naser al-Din Shah, the King of Persia from 1848 to May 1896. She was the love interest of Yousef Abdu Aref Qazvini  who wrote his poem Fe eh ya Qajar for her.

Life

In her memoires, she describes her upbringing in the royal harem, using details of court rules about having wet nurses and slaves as an opening to criticize Qajar society and the limitations Persian women faced. She describes her understanding of the successful plot and assassination of her father in 1896. 

She was married at age 13 to Sardar Hassan Shojah al-Saltaneh, an aristocrat and the son of the defense minister Shojah al-Saltaneh. They had four children. 
Taj divorced her husband, breaking a taboo and becoming one of the first women in the royal family to get a divorce.  

She detailed the pain of her betrothal at age eight and damage from arranged marriages.  She makes a pointed argument against veiling as damaging to family life and overall Persian society.  The account also includes the pain from her husband's extramarital affairs and her choice to have an abortion out of fear of a death during childbirth.

In her later years, she dedicated her life to writing, reading and raising her beloved granddaughter Taj Iran, with whom she had a special bond and heavily influenced her upbringing. She lived with her daughter Tooran al-Dowleh until she died.

Pioneer
She was a writer, a painter, an intellectual, and an activist who hosted literary salons at her house once a week. She was fluent in Arabic and French and played the violin. She was the first woman in court to take off the hijab and wear western clothes. The first to write a memoir and a vocal critic of the monarchy under her father Naser al-Din Shah and brother Mozaffar ad-Din Shah's rule. She blamed many of Iran's problems then, including poverty, lack of education for masses and women's rights, on incompetent monarchs. Her voice was a lone female voice advocating for change and democracy.

Feminism
Taj al-Saltaneh was a trailblazer for women's rights in Iran and a feminist.  She was a prominent founding member of Iran's underground women's rights group Women's Freedom Association, working for equal rights for women circa 1910.  She secretly organized and attended underground women's rights meetings telling her children and grandchildren that she was attending religious sessions.  She once led a women's rights march to parliament and was an avid supporter of Iran's constitutional revolution.

Anti slavery opinion

Zahra Khanom Tadj es-Saltaneh was raised by a staff African slaves, as was the custom, who were referred to as "bond servants", and expressed sympathy for them and dislike of the system of slavery in her memoirs:
‘The nanny specifically had to be a negress, since honor and grandeur at that time were measured by ownership of creatures whom God has made no differently from others, except for the color of their skin a distinction that in all honesty does not exist at the divine threshold. These poor people were kept in captivity and abject submission, made the instruments of their owners’ greatness, and called “bond servants”. They were bought and sold like so much cattle’.

Memoirs
Her memoirs were published under the title of Crowning Anguish: Memoirs of a Persian Princess from the Harem to Modernity 1884 – 1914 (1996), edited with a preface by Abbas Amanat and translated by Anna Vanzan and Amin Neshati. They were well received, the Times Literary Supplement describing them thus: "In somewhat unusual and cumbersome style, Taj's memoirs, written in 1914, cover a thirty-year span of a rapidly changing era [...] A curious blend of the reconstructive and reflective, Taj al Saltaneh's memoirs bring home the intense conflicts of a life straddling the harem and modernism." (March 4, 1994) Nesta Ramazaini's review in The Middle East Journal praised the book's open description of the daily life and political infighting in the Qajar harem.

Her hand-written memoir remained unpublished until 60 years after her death, and is currently in the archives of Iran's National Library.

Legacy
She is buried in the Zahir od-Dowleh Cemetery in Tajrish. Her life and her writing and her role as a feminist is a subject of Middle Eastern studies in universities from Tehran University to Harvard. In 2015 Harvard acquired from her descendants their family photos, writings, anecdotes and stories about Taj al-Saltaneh's life for its archives.

See also
 Farnaz Fassihi

Gallery

References

Further reading
 
 Mahdavi, Shireen.  Taj al-Saltaneh, an Emancipated Qajar Princess. Middle Eastern Studies, Vol. 23, No. 2 (Apr., 1987), pp. 188–193.
 Najmabadi, Afsaneh. Tāj-al-Salṭana. Encyclopædia Iranica.

External links
A brief history of women's movements in Iran 1850 - 2001 (parstimes.com)
 Women’s Worlds in Qajar Iran  (qajarwomen.org, Harvard University)
 prinzessin qajar  (tunlog.com)

1884 births
1936 deaths
People of the Persian Constitutional Revolution
Qajar princesses
Iranian feminists
20th-century memoirists
Iranian memoirists
Women memoirists
Abolitionists